Braude is a surname. Notable people with the surname include:

 Semion Braude, Ukrainian physicist and radio astronomer
 Leopold Janno Braude, native name of the inventor of the Brodie helmet
Stephen E. Braude
Jim Braude
Marvin Braude
Anna Braude Heller

See also
Braude (crater)
 Broda (disambiguation)
 Brode (disambiguation)
 Broder